Sara Ibrahim (born 8 May 1983) is a former Chair of the Young Fabians (2011–2012), Barrister and British Labour Party activist.

Background

Sara Ibrahim gained a Bachelor of Arts in History at Fitzwilliam College, Cambridge. She was later called to the Bar at Lincoln's Inn.
 
In 2011 she was elected National Chair of the Young Fabians.

She was a member of the Young Fabians Executive for five consecutive terms 2008-2012 and held roles including Vice Chair in 2010/11 and Chair in 2011/12. As Chair she oversaw the expansion of the Young Fabian Networks, with the formation of the Health Network and in November 2011 published the Young Fabian Pamphlet, Ambitions for Britain's Future.

She is a member of the Fabian Society Executive, first elected in November 2012. She currently services as Vice-Chair of the Fabian Society.

Sara is currently an employment barrister working for 3 Hare Court, advising and acts in a broad range of civil and commercial matters with a particular focus on employment, commercial, insolvency, professional negligence and personal injury cases.

In March 2015 Sara Ibrahim was appointed to the C Panel of counsel serving the Equality and Human Rights Commission, for a term of four years.

References

External links
 3 Hare Court
 Young Fabian Pamphlet, Ambitions for Britain's Future
 Sara Ibrahim on Progress Online
 Young Fabians website
 Sara Ibrahim on LabourList
 Young Fabians YouTube

Living people
Labour Party (UK) politicians
1983 births
School governors
Alumni of Fitzwilliam College, Cambridge
Members of the Fabian Society